The Women's slalom competition of the Sarajevo 1984 Olympics was held at Jahorina.

The defending world champion was Erika Hess of Switzerland, who was also the defending World Cup slalom champion and the leader of the 1984 World Cup.

Results

References 

Women's slalom
Oly
Alp